Minawa Beach is an unincorporated community in the town of Taycheddah, Fond du Lac County, United States.

Notes

Unincorporated communities in Fond du Lac County, Wisconsin
Unincorporated communities in Wisconsin